The 1906 Prima Categoria season was won by Milan.

Qualifications

Piedmont
Juventus was the only registered team.

Liguria
Played on 7 January and 14 January

|}

Lombardy
Played on 7 January and 14 January

|}

Final round

Results

|}

(*) The match was suspended on 1–0 and repeated in a neutral ground.

Repetition

|}

Final classification

Tie-breaker
Played in Turin on April 29

|}

Repetition
Played in Milan on May 6

|}

Milan was declared champion.

References and sources
Almanacco Illustrato del Calcio - La Storia 1898-2004, Panini Edizioni, Modena, September 2005

Footnotes

1906
1905–06 in European association football leagues
1905–06 in Italian football